South Harwich station was a train station located in South Harwich, Massachusetts. The station was built in 1887 by the Chatham Railroad Company when the line was extended beyond Harwich.

References

1887 establishments in Massachusetts
Harwich, Massachusetts
Old Colony Railroad Stations on Cape Cod
Stations along Old Colony Railroad lines
Former railway stations in Massachusetts
Railway stations opened in 1887